Veep (also known as Veepe, Veeps, Veepu, Veepus, Veepy, Vepa, Vape, Vapey, Vepe, Vepus, Weep, Wenep, Wepe, Wimp or Wymp; died 6th century) is the Cornish saint for whom the village and parish of St Veep were named.

In records Veep appears inconsistently as male or female; the "unusual degree of confusion about the saint's gender suggests that, by the later middle ages, the name was largely that of a place-name rather than a saint with an active cult." as may be the reason for the change in dedication to the parish church of St Veep.

Veep may have been a daughter of King Brychan of Brycheiniog who is called Wennap (also Wennapa, Gwennap) or Weneu in Welsh records. Veep's feast day is 1 July.

References

External links

Catholic Online: St. Veep

Children of Brychan
Welsh Roman Catholic saints
Medieval Cornish saints